The Teatro Real (Royal Theatre) is an opera house in Madrid, Spain. Located at the Plaza de Oriente, opposite the Royal Palace, and known colloquially as El Real, it is considered the top institution of the performing and musical arts in the country and one of the most prestigious opera houses in Europe.

The groundbreaking of the Teatro Real was on 23 April 1818, under the reign of King Ferdinand VII, and it was formally opened by his daughter Queen Isabella II on 19 November 1850. It closed in 1925 due to damage to the building and reopened on 13 October 1966 as a symphonic music venue.

Since 1995, the theatre is managed by a public foundation in whose Board of Trustees are represented the Ministry of Culture of the Government of Spain, the Government of the Community of Madrid and the City Council of Madrid. Since 1998, its principal orchestra is the Orquesta Sinfónica de Madrid.

In addition to its regular annual program of opera, dance, concerts and recitals, the theatre has hosted other special events throughout its history, such as the 14th Eurovision Song Contest in 1969, the 25th Goya Awards in 2011 or the Lotería Nacional's Christmas special draw since 2012. The Teatro Real received the "Opera Company of the Year" award at the 2020/21 International Opera Awards. The building is listed as a Bien de Interés Cultural since 1993.

History

Background
The former Teatro de los Caños del Peral was a theatre, built over an earlier corral de comedias, and opened in 1738 under the reign of King Philip V. It got its name from the nearby Fountain of the Pear Tree Canals. The theater was demolished in 1817 to clear the space for the current Teatro Real.

Early years
The current theatre was founded by King Ferdinand VII in 1818, and after thirty-two years of planning and construction, a Royal Order on 7 May 1850, decreed the immediate completion of the "Teatro de Oriente" and the building works were finished within five months. The opera house, located just opposite the Palacio Real, the official residence of the royal family, was finally inaugurated by Queen Isabella II on 19 November 1850, attending the performance of Donizetti's La favorite.

The Teatro soon became one of the most prestigious opera houses in Europe. For over five decades it hosted the most renowned singers and composers of the time. In the early period, it saw famous opera singers such as Alboni, Frezzolini, Marietta Gazzaniga, Rosina Penco, Giulia Grisi, Giorgio Ronconi, Italo Gardoni, Mario de Candia and Antonio Selva among many others. In 1863, Giuseppe Verdi visited the theatre for the Spanish premiere of his La forza del destino. At its peak, in the last quarter of the 19th century, the Teatro hosted world renowned artists such as Adela Borghi, Marie Sasse, Adelina Patti, Christina Nilsson, Luisa Tetrazzini, Mattia Battistini, Julián Gayarre, Angelo Masini, Francesco Tamagno and Enrico Tamberlick. In 1925, the Ballets Russes of Diaghilev performed in the theatre with the presence of Nijinsky and Stravinsky.

As a concert hall
In December 1925 a Royal Order ordered its activities to be discontinued owing to the damage that the construction of the Metro de Madrid had caused to the building. The government set out to restore it and ordered numerous projects to be drawn out for its renovation, such as that from architect Antonio Flórez Urdapilleta, who proposed a monumental remodeling of the building. However, the Civil War and the post-war financial difficulties prevented the completion of these projects and led to a simple restoration, sponsored by the Juan March Institute, and carried out first by the architect Manuel Gonzalez Valcárcel, and later by architects Miguel Verdú Belmonte and Francisco Rodriguez Partearroyo.

The theatre reopened on 13 October 1966 as a concert hall as well as the main concert venue for the Spanish National Orchestra and the RTVE Symphony Orchestra. The reopening was celebrated with a concert of the Spanish National Orchestra, conducted by Rafael Frühbeck de Burgos, in which it was performed Beethoven's Symphony No. 9 –together with the Orfeón Donostiarra– and Manuel de Falla's Homenajes. The venue closed for renovations with a last concert by the Spanish National Orchestra on 13 October 1988.

From 1867 to 1925 and from 1966 to 1990, the Teatro Real also housed the Madrid Royal Conservatory and the Royal Higher College of Performing Arts.

Remodeling

Starting on 2 January 1991, the house was remodeled to host opera again. The building was completed in late 1995, then the process of technical, administrative, artistic and functional organization began which led to the opening of the theatre by King Juan Carlos I and Queen Sofía on 11 October 1997. The opera program performed at the reopening was El sombrero de tres picos and La vida breve by Manuel de Falla, which was immediately followed by the world premiere of the opera Divinas Palabras by Antón García Abril –actually commissioned to open the house– with Plácido Domingo in the cast.

The remodeling was based on the old classical style of opera house with only basic modernization leaving many seats without a view of the stage. A considerable percentage of seats have a limited or zero view of the stage and a live stream of operas and ballets is projected on the upper side walls of the house so that the entire audience can follow the performance regardless of their view of the stage.

Productions

The theatre stages around seventeen opera titles and two or three major ballets per annual season, from September to July, both own productions or co-productions with other major opera houses abroad, as well as concerts and recitals.

The most popular operas at the Teatro Real have included Verdi's Rigoletto with 387 performances, followed by Aida with 361 and Il trovatore with 342. Two works by Meyerbeer L'Africaine –with 268– and Les Huguenots –with 243– have been shown to draw audiences, although the former work has not been performed since the 1920s, being no longer considered mainstream repertory. Donizetti's Lucrezia Borgia has been given some 218 performances since its debut in the house in 1919.

World premieres
In addition of the world premiere of Divinas Palabras by Antón García Abril, the Teatro Real has staged another sixteen world opera premieres since its reopening: Don Quijote by Cristóbal Halffter (2000), La señorita Cristina by Luis de Pablo (2001), Dulcinea by Mauricio Sotelo (2006), El viaje a Simorgh by José María Sánchez-Verdú (2007), Faust-Bal by Leonardo Balada (2009), La página en blanco by Pilar Jurado (2011), The Perfect American by Philip Glass (2013), Brokeback Mountain by Charles Wuorinen (2014), The Public by Mauricio Sotelo (2015), La ciudad de las mentiras by Elena Mendoza (2017), El Pintor by Juan J. Colomer (2018), Je suis narcissiste by Raquel García-Tomás (2019), Marie by Germán Alonso (2020), Tránsito by Jesús Torres (2021), El abrecartas by Luis de Pablo (2022) and Extinción by Señor Serrano Group (2022).

The company also premiered the first complete staging, with sets and scenography, of Isaac Albéniz's Merlin in 2003 –101 years after its completion–, the first modern revival of Vicente Martín y Soler's Il burbero di buon cuore in 2007 and Poppea e Nerone, a new orchestration for a modern chamber orchestra of Claudio Monteverdi's L'incoronazione di Poppea, by Philippe Boesmans in 2012.

Bicentenary
The Teatro Real celebrated its bicentenary with a special programme from 2016 through 2018. One of the operas featured was Bellini's I puritani, a co-production with the Teatro Municipal of Santiago, Chile. A performance of this work was streamed in July 2016 via the Teatro Real's Facebook page, an example of the theatre extending its reach by digital services.  The event was also relayed to a number of venues and was a national trending topic on Twitter. The same production has been performed by the company –including orchestra and chorus– in August 2017 at the Savonlinna Opera Festival.

Company
Since 1998, the principal orchestra of the Teatro Real is the Orquesta Sinfónica de Madrid. The current artistic manager is Joan Matabosch, former director of Gran Teatre del Liceu in Barcelona. The current music director of the company is Ivor Bolton, since 2015. The current principal guest conductors are Pablo Heras-Casado and Nicola Luisotti. Bolton is scheduled to stand down as music director at the close of the 2024–25 season. In July 2022, the company announced the appointment of Gustavo Gimeno as its next music director, effective with the 2025–26 season, with an initial contract of five years.

Artistic directors (partial list)
 Stéphane Lissner (1995–1997)
 Luis Antonio García Navarro (1997–2001, artistic and music director)
 Emilio Sagi (2001–2005)
 Antonio Moral (2005–2010)
 Gerard Mortier (2010–2013) (artistic advisor from 2014)
 Joan Matabosch (2014–present)

Music directors (partial list)
 Luis Antonio García Navarro (1997–2001, artistic and music director)
 Jesús López Cobos (2003–2010)
 Ivor Bolton (2015–present)

Special Events
The Teatro Real has hosted some special events throughout its history. On 13 February 2011, the Academy of Cinematographic Arts and Sciences of Spain held the 25th Goya Awards ceremony at the theatre. Every 22 December since 2012, Loterías y Apuestas del Estado holds its Lotería Nacional's Christmas special draw there.

Tours of the building
The Opera House offers daily different types of guided tours, lasting between 50 and 90 minutes and given in various languages. This gives the public the opportunity to learn about the building, including the stage area, the workshops and the rehearsal spaces.

See also

 Madrid Symphony Orchestra
 Spanish National Orchestra
 RTVE Symphony Orchestra
 Community of Madrid Orchestra
 Queen Sofía Chamber Orchestra
 National Auditorium of Music
 Teatro Monumental
 Zarzuela

References

External links

 Teatro Real official web site
 Teatro Real  at Google Cultural Institute

Entertainment venues in Madrid
Opera houses in Spain
Theatres in Spain
Bien de Interés Cultural landmarks in Madrid
Theatres completed in 1850
Music venues completed in 1850
Buildings and structures in Palacio neighborhood, Madrid